The 1917 Dartmouth football team was an American football team that represented Dartmouth College as an independent during the 1917 college football season. In its first season under head coach Clarence Spears, the team compiled a 5–3 record and outscored opponents by a total of 83 to 68. Hubert McDonough was the team captain.

Schedule

References

Dartmouth
Dartmouth Big Green football seasons
Dartmouth football